Aghaei is a surname. Notable people with the surname include:

Abbas Aghaei (born 1977), Iranian footballer
Maysam Aghaei (born 1990), Iranian footballer
Saeid Aghaei (born 1995), Iranian footballer
Soraya Aghaei (born 1996), Iranian badminton player

See also
Mohsen Amoo-Aghaei, Iranian Paralympic athlete